Deb Gullett (born April 23, 1956) is a former member of the Arizona House of Representatives from January 2001 until January 2005. She was first elected to the House in November 2000, representing District 18, and was re-elected in 2002 after re-districting, to the 11th District. She did not run for re-election in 2004.

References

Republican Party members of the Arizona House of Representatives
1956 births
Living people